Hornets Nest or hornet's nest may refer to:

Places
Hornets Nest, Virginia, an unincorporated community in Gloucester County
Charlotte, North Carolina, nicknamed The Hornet's Nest and home to the Charlotte Hornets

Arts and entertainment
The Hornet's Nest (1919), American drama film directed by James Young
Hornet's Nest (1923 film), British drama film directed by Walter West
The Hornet's Nest (1955 film), British comedy film
Hornets' Nest (1970), an Italian-American war film directed by Phil Karlson
 Hornet's Nest (novel), a 1997 novel
 The Hornet's Nest: A Novel of the Revolutionary War, a 2003 novel by former president Jimmy Carter
Hornets' Nest (audio drama), a 2009 Doctor Who audio play
The Hornet's Nest (2014), an American documentary film about the Afghanistan War

Other uses
Hornet's Nest (Civil War), a salient held by the Union army in the 1862 Battle of Shiloh
Hornets Nest (Sacramento State), a gymnasium at California State University, Sacramento
Hornet's nest, an insect nest

See also
The Girl Who Kicked the Hornets' Nest (2007), the third novel in Stieg Larsson's Millennium series